In mathematics, particularly differential topology, the secondary vector bundle structure
refers to the natural vector bundle structure  on the total space TE of the tangent bundle of a smooth vector bundle , induced by the push-forward  of the original projection map .
This gives rise to a double vector bundle structure .

In the special case , where  is the double tangent bundle, the secondary vector bundle  is isomorphic to the tangent bundle
 of  through the canonical flip.

Construction of the secondary vector bundle structure 
Let  be a smooth vector bundle of rank .

of the original addition and scalar multiplication

as its vector space operations. The triple  becomes a smooth vector bundle with these vector space operations on its fibres.

Proof 

be a coordinate system on  adapted to it. Then

Now it turns out that

and

so each fibre  is a vector space and the triple  is a smooth vector bundle.

Linearity of connections on vector bundles 
The general Ehresmann connection  on a vector bundle  can be characterized in terms of the connector map

The mapping

Then the connection is called linear. Note that the connector map is automatically linear with respect to the tangent bundle structure .

See also 
 Connection (vector bundle)
 Double tangent bundle
 Ehresmann connection
 Vector bundle

References 

 P.Michor. Topics in Differential Geometry, American Mathematical Society (2008).

Differential geometry
Topology
Differential topology